Intersex UK is an organisation by and for intersex people (those born with differences of sex development or variations of sex anatomy) in the United Kingdom and Ireland. Intersex UK works to protect the bodily autonomy and civil rights of intersex children, adolescents, and their families through government lobbying and educational outreach.

Mission 

Intersex UK's mission is to end unnecessary surgeries and normalizing hormonal regimens on intersex infants and adolescents, promote bodily autonomy, and lobby for increased public education and access to identification documents with preferred gender markers.

Advocacy

Physical integrity and bodily autonomy
Co-founder Holly Greenberry spoke at the "first United Nations Human Rights Council side event on intersex issues" in March 2014, alongside Mauro Cabral and representatives of Organisation Intersex International Australia and Zwischengeschlecht.

Greenberry was quoted in a feature in The Independent stating: “We are at a tipping point ... Most intelligent human beings would be completely surprised and utterly dismayed at the civil inequality and human rights abuses that healthy intersex children and young adults are facing.” Greenberry also appeared with Abigail Tarttelin on BBC Radio 4 discussing challenges facing the intersex community as well as Tarttelin's novel, Golden Boy.

Identification documents
Greenberry notes that intersex people in the United Kingdom are not able to change gender shown on identification documents and thus do not have the right to marriage or civil partnerships, however this does not affect all intersex people.

Media work
The organisation also undertakes media work to promote human rights.

See also 
 Intersex human rights
 Intersex rights in the United Kingdom
 Intersex rights by country

References

External links 

Intersex rights organizations
Intersex medical and health organizations
Intersex support groups
Intersex rights in the United Kingdom
Advocacy groups in the United Kingdom